William Redd, also known as Si Redd (1911–2003) was an American businessman and philanthropist. He was the founder of International Game Technology, a slot machine manufacturer and distributor. He was the owner of the Oasis, a hotel and casino in Mesquite, Nevada. He was the rightsholder of video poker, and he became known as the "king of slot machines".

Early life
William Redd was born on November 16, 1911 in Union, Mississippi. His father was a sharecropper. He grew up in Philadelphia, Mississippi.

Redd attended East Central Junior College in Decatur, Mississippi, and he graduated from the University of Mississippi in Oxford, Mississippi.

Career
Redd began his career in college, when he invested in a pinball machine in a small eatery in Mississippi. He subsequently founded Northwestern Music Co., and he distributed Wurlitzer jukeboxes in Sterling, Illinois and Dixon, Illinois with his brother-in-law. He subsequently became a distributor for Bally Manufacturing in Boston, Massachusetts. In 1967, he moved on to the Reno, Nevada market. Redd founded a subsidiary, Bally Distribution Co., and he distributed jukeboxes in Carson City, Nevada and Las Vegas. He also acquired the rights to video poker. In 1975, he founded Sircoma, later known as the International Game Technology, a slot machine manufacturer and distributor based in Reno, Nevada. He sold it to Gtech in 1986, and he served on its board of directors until 1991.

Redd developed Pride of Mississippi, a gaming boat off the coast of Mississippi on the Gulf of Mexico, but it went bankrupt and he lost US$20 million in it. He was the owner of Oasis, a hotel and casino in Mesquite, Nevada from 1976 to 2001. He sold it for US$31 million. Meanwhile, he founded the Mesquite Vistas Land Development Co. and the Oasis Golf Course.

Redd was inducted into the Gaming Hall of Fame in 1991, and the Nevada Business Hall of Fame in 2002.

Philanthropy
Redd made charitable contributions to the University of Nevada, Las Vegas, where he was a member of the UNLV Gift Club Palladium Society. Moreover, the Si Redd Room and the Redd Vision video screen scoreboard at the Thomas & Mack Center are named in his honor. He received the Chin's Humanitarian of the Year Award from the Muscular Dystrophy Association in 2001.

Redd founded the Las Vegas International Cultural Trade Center and Wild Animal Conservancy. He donated US$150,000 to Problem Gambling Consultants, a non-profit organization for gambling addicts.

Personal life, death and legacy
Redd was married three times. His first wife, Ivy Lee, died in 1974. His second wife, Marilyn, died in 1996. His third wife, Tamara, outlived him. He had two daughters, Vinnie Copeland and Sherry Green. He resided in Las Vegas, Nevada and summered in Solana Beach, California. He was a member of the Las Vegas Country Club.

Redd died on October 14, 2003 in Solana Beach, California. He was 91 years old. His funeral was held at the Palm Mortuary in Las Vegas, Nevada.

His son-in-law, Alan Green, serves as the chief executive of the Mesquite Vistas Land Development Co. and the Oasis Golf Course.

References

Further reading

External links
Si Redd on the University of Nevada, Las Vegas's Lee Business School's YouTube channel

1911 births
2003 deaths
People from Philadelphia, Mississippi
People from Las Vegas
People from Solana Beach, California
University of Mississippi alumni
Businesspeople from Mississippi
Businesspeople from Nevada
Businesspeople from California
American company founders
American casino industry businesspeople
American corporate directors
Philanthropists from Mississippi
Philanthropists from Nevada
Philanthropists from California
People from Union, Mississippi
People from Mesquite, Nevada
20th-century American philanthropists
20th-century American businesspeople